This page is a list of dams and reservoirs in Portugal, arranged by NUTS Regions and Subregions:

Norte

Alto Tâmega
 Alto Tâmega Dam
 Daivões Dam
 Gouvães Dam

Cávado
 Caniçada Dam, Parada do Bouro, Vieira do Minho
 Salamonde Dam, Salamonde, Vieira do Minho
 Vilarinho das Furnas Dam, Campo do Gerês, Terras de Bouro

Douro
 Cuerda del Pozo Dam
 Los Rábanos Dam
 San José Dam
 Villalcampo Dam
 Castro Dam
 Miranda Dam
 Picote Dam
 Bemposta Dam
 Aldeadávila Dam
 Saucelle Dam
 Pocinho Dam
 Valeira Dam São João da Pesqueira, São João da Pesqueira
 Régua Dam
 Carrapatelo Dam, Santa Cristina, Mesão Frio
 Crestuma–Lever Dam
 Bagaúste Dam, Peso da Régua, Peso da Régua

Grande Porto
 Crestuma–Lever Dam, Foz do Sousa, Gondomar

Minho-Lima
 Alto Lindoso Dam, Lindoso, Ponte da Barca

Centro

Beiras e Serra da Estrela
 Sabugal Dam, Sabugal, Sabugal
 Barragem Marques da Silva, Seia

Beira Baixa
 Cabril Dam, Sertã
 Fratel Dam, Vila Velha de Ródão
 Barragem da Marateca Castelo Branco, Portugal
 Marechal Carmona Dam, Idanha-a-Nova

Coimbra
 Aguieira Dam, Penacova
 Santa Luzia Dam, Pampilhosa da Serra

Médio Tejo
 Pracana Dam, Mação

Lisboa e Vale do Tejo
 Castelo de Bode Dam, São Pedro de Tomar, Tomar

Alentejo

Alto Alentejo
 Belver Dam, Belver, Gavião

 Maranhão Dam, Maranhão, Avis

Alentejo Central
 Alqueva Dam, Alqueva, Portel

Alentejo Litoral
 Santa Clara-a-Velha Dam, Santa Clara-a-Velha, Odemira

Baixo Alentejo
 Capela Dam, Peroguarda, Ferreira do Alentejo
 Castelo Ventoso Dam, Ferreira do Alentejo, Ferreira do Alentejo
 Marmelo Dam, Ferreira do Alentejo, Ferreira do Alentejo
 Sequeiro Dam, Canhestros, Ferreira do Alentejo

Algarve
 Fonte Coberta Dam, São Sebastião, Lagos
 Bravura Dam, Odiaxere, Lagos
 Odelouca River Dam, Silves 
 Ribeira do Arade Dam, Silves, Silves

 List
Lists of buildings and structures in Portugal
Portugal